Chlamys australis, common name the "austral scallop", is a species of scallop, a marine bivalve mollusc in the family Pectinidae, the scallops.

Description
Like almost all scallops, the shell is fan-shaped and composed of two valves, each of which is convex and has broad ribs. The ribs radiate from the umbone, the rounded protuberance near the hinge. Again, like all scallops, beside the hinge are two irregular shelly flaps or auricles; the anterior one is normally much larger than the posterior one. Like all scallops the interior of each valve shows a central round scar which is the attachment area for the single strong adductor muscle which closes the two valves of the shell. The background color of the exterior of the shell in this species varies from yellow to light purple. Like almost all bivalve species, this one is a filter feeder, sieving microscopic algae from water that passes through its gills.

Distribution and habitat
This species is native to Southwest Australia. It lives on the seabed in the sublittoral zone.

References

External links
 Biolib
 Discover Life
 EoL
 Derek A. Cropp - Hatchery culture potential of the scallop Chlamys australis in Western Australia

Bivalves described in 1844
australis